Frascaro is a comune (municipality) in the Province of Alessandria in the Italian region Piedmont, located about  southeast of Turin and about  southwest of Alessandria. 

Frascaro borders the following municipalities: Borgoratto Alessandrino, Carentino, Castellazzo Bormida, Gamalero, and Mombaruzzo.

References

Cities and towns in Piedmont